The Cradle of Humankind is a paleoanthropological site and is located about  northwest of Johannesburg, South Africa, in the Gauteng province. Declared a World Heritage Site by UNESCO in 1999, the site is home to the largest concentration of human ancestral remains anywhere in the world. The site currently occupies  and contains a complex system of limestone caves. The registered name of the site in the list of World Heritage Sites is Fossil Hominid Sites of South Africa.

According to the South African Journal of Science, Bolt's Farm is the place where the earliest primate was discovered. Bolt's Farm was heavily mined for speleothem (calcium carbonate from stalagmites, stalactites and flowstones) in the terminal 19th and early 20th centuries.

The Sterkfontein Caves were the site of the discovery of a 2.3-million-year-old fossil Australopithecus africanus (nicknamed "Mrs. Ples"), found in 1947 by Robert Broom and John T. Robinson. The find helped corroborate the 1924 discovery of the juvenile Australopithecus africanus skull known as the "Taung Child", by Raymond Dart, at Taung in the North West Province of South Africa, where excavations still continue.

Nearby, but not in the site, the Rising Star Cave system contains the Dinaledi Chamber (chamber of stars), in which were discovered fifteen fossil skeletons of an extinct species of hominin, provisionally named Homo naledi.

Sterkfontein alone has produced more than a third of early hominid fossils ever found prior to 2010. The Dinaledi Chamber contains over 1,500 H. naledi fossils, the most extensive discovery of a single hominid species ever found in Africa.

Etymology
The name Cradle of Humankind reflects the fact that the site has produced a substantially large number of hominin fossils, some of the oldest ever found, dating as far back as 3.5 million years ago.

History of discoveries

In 1935, Robert Broom found the first ape-man fossils at Sterkfontein and began work at this site. 
In 1938, a young schoolboy, Gert Terrblanche, brought Raymond Dart fragments of a skull from nearby Kromdraai which later were identified as Paranthropus robustus. Also in 1938, a single ape-man tooth was found at the Cooper's site between Kromdraai and Sterkfontein. In 1948, the Camp-Peabody Expedition from the United States worked at Bolts Farm and Gladysvale looking for fossil hominids but failed to find any. Later in 1948, Robert Broom identified the first hominid remains from Swartkrans cave. In 1954, C.K. Brain began working at sites in the Cradle, including Cooper's Cave. He then initiated his three-decade work at Swartkrans cave, which resulted in the recovery of the second-largest sample of hominid remains from the Cradle. The oldest controlled use of fire by Homo erectus was also discovered at Swartkrans and dated to over 1 million years ago.

In 1966, Phillip Tobias began his excavations of Sterkfontein which are still continuing and are the longest continuously running fossil excavations in the world. In 1991, Lee Berger of the University of the Witwatersrand discovered the first hominid specimens from the Gladysvale site, making this the first new early hominid site to be discovered in South Africa in 48 years. In 1994, Andre Keyser discovered fossil hominids at the site of Drimolen. In 1997, Kevin Kuykendall and Colin Menter of the University of the Witwatersrand found two fossil hominid teeth at the site of Gondolin. Also in 1997, the near-complete Australopithecus skeleton of "Little Foot", dating to around 3.3 million years ago (although more recent dating suggest it is closer to 2.5 million years ago), was discovered by Ron Clarke. In 2001, Steve Churchill of Duke University and Lee Berger found early modern human remains at Plovers Lake. Also in 2001, the first hominid fossils and stone tools were discovered in-situ at Coopers. In 2008, Lee Berger discovered the partial remains of two hominids (Australopithecus sediba) in the Malapa Fossil Site that lived between 1.78 and 1.95 million years ago.

In October 2013, Berger commissioned geologist Pedro Boshoff to investigate cave systems in the Cradle of Humankind for the express purpose of discovering more fossil hominin sites. Cavers Rick Hunter and Steven Tucker discovered hominid fossils in a previously unexplored area of the Rising Star/Westminster Cave System assigned site designation UW-101. In November 2013, Berger led a joint expedition of the University of the Witwatersrand and National Geographic Society to the Rising Star Cave System near Swartkrans. In just three weeks of excavation, the six-woman international team of advance speleological scientists (K. Lindsay Eaves, Marina Elliott, Elen Feuerriegel, Alia Gurtov, Hannah Morris, and Becca Peixotto), chosen for their paleoanthropological and caving skills, as well as their small size, recovered over 1,200 specimens of a presently unidentified fossil hominin species. The site is still in the process of being dated. In September 2015, Berger, in collaboration with National Geographic, announced the discovery of a new species of human relative, named Homo naledi, from UW-101. Most remarkably, besides shedding light on the origins and diversity of our genus, H. naledi also appears to have intentionally deposited bodies of its dead in a remote cave chamber, a behaviour previously thought limited to humans. In the last days of the Rising Star Expedition, cavers Rick Hunter and Steven Tucker discovered additional fossil hominid material in another portion of the cave system. Preliminary excavations at this site, designated UW-102, have begun and yielded complete hominid fossil material of its own. It is unknown what the relationship of sites 101 and 102 is.

Geological context
The hominin remains at the Cradle of Humankind are found in dolomitic caves, and are often encased in a mixture of limestone and other sediments called breccia that fossilised over time. Hominids may have lived all over Africa, but their remains are found only at sites where conditions allowed for the formation and preservation of fossils.

Visitor centres

On 7 December 2005, South African President Thabo Mbeki opened the new Maropeng Visitors Centre at the site. Per the maropeng.co.za website, visitors can see fossils, view stone tools, and learn about the birth of humankind in the visitors centre. The visitors centre additionally offers a tour of the Sterkfontein Caves and the exhibition at Sterkfontein. A light, moveable, steel structure known as the Beetle has been placed over the Malapa site, to allow the paying public to view excavations, once they resume at the site. (Digging has been on hold since 2009, when the remains of four A. sediba individuals were removed.)

See also

 Wonder Cave
Cradle of civilization
Dawn of Humanity, a 2015 PBS film
Muldersdrift
Recent African origin of modern humans
Maropeng Cavemen, South Africa field hockey club

References

Further reading
L.R. Berger and B. Hilton-Barber, Field Guide to the Cradle of Humankind (Struik, 2003)

External links

 BBC, "Richest human fossil site found in South Africa", 28 November 2013
 National Geographic, Rising Star Expedition
Sterkfontein and Maropeng visitor attractions website
Maropeng – The Cradle of Humankind Official Website
UNESCO – Fossil Hominid Sites of Sterkfontein, Swartkrans, Kromdraai, and Environs
Cradle of Humankind Map
Palaeo Tours – Scientist-led tours to the "Cradle"
Human Timeline (Interactive) – Smithsonian, National Museum of Natural History (August 2016).

Geography of Gauteng
Paleoanthropological sites

World Heritage Sites in South Africa
Prehistoric Africa
Tourist attractions in Johannesburg
Fossil parks
Paleontology in South Africa